Johann Georg Palitzsch (11 June 1723 – 21 February 1788) was a German astronomer who became famous for recovering Comet 1P/Halley (better known as Halley's Comet) on Christmas Day, 1758.  The periodic nature of this comet had been deduced by its namesake Edmond Halley in 1705, but Halley had died before seeing if his prediction would come true.
 
Raised to become a successful farmer under a strict stepfather, Palitzsch secretly studied as much astronomy as he could from the books he could afford.  He learned contemporary astronomy from the book “Vorhof der Sternwissenschaft” (“The Forecourt of Astronomy”) by Christian Pescheck.  He learned Latin and, at age 21, inherited the farm, which allowed him to construct his own botanical garden, library, laboratory, and museum.
He received support from various benefactors, including the future King. But the wars between Prussia and Austria interrupted his ambitions.

Upon his death on 21 February 1788 Palitzsch left behind a library of 3518 books, partly consisting of handwritten copies he had created from scientific works too expensive for him to purchase.

A crater and a vallis (valley) on the Moon are named after him.

The asteroid 11970 Palitzsch also is named after him.

References

External links 

 http://messier.seds.org/xtra/Bios/palitzsch.html
 Homepage of the Palitzsch-Museum

1723 births
1788 deaths
18th-century German astronomers